Mahlon H. Hellerich (January 20, 1919 – January 17, 2010) was an American Lutheran local historian and president of the Pennsylvania German Society from 1973 to 1979. He was also executive director of the Lehigh County Historical Society from 1974 to 1976. 

Hellerich attended Muhlenberg College in Allentown, Pennsylvania, where he graduated as valedictorian in 1940. He went on to receive his M.A. at Columbia University (1947) and Ph.D. from the University of Pennsylvania in 1957. He was academic dean of Albright College in Reading, Pennsylvania from 1959 to 1966. 

Hellerich died in Allentown, Pennsylvania on January 17, 2010 and was interred in Trexlertown, Pennsylvania.

Works
Lehigh Heritage (1979)
Allentown 1762-1987: A 225 Year History (1987)
A Journey of Faith: Brief Histories of Bethlehem's Religious Communities (1992)
(editor) Proceedings of the Lehigh County Historical Society

External links
Grave in Trexlertown, Pennsylvania

1919 births
2010 deaths
20th-century American historians
20th-century American male writers
American Lutherans
American male non-fiction writers
Columbia University alumni
Lutheran writers
Muhlenberg College alumni
University of Pennsylvania alumni